Joshua Keeler Ramsay (born June 11, 1985) is a Canadian singer, songwriter, producer, recording engineer, and multi-instrumentalist. He is best known for being the lead vocalist of the pop rock band Marianas Trench. He has produced and has written songs for a wide array of artists including Carly Rae Jepsen, Nickelback, 5 Seconds of Summer, Faber Drive, and Emily Osment.

Early life
Josh Ramsay was born in Vancouver, British Columbia, although he currently has dual citizenship in Canada and the United States. He went to high school at Magee Secondary School, where he was later expelled due to his heroin addiction. He grew up in a family filled with music, where his mother was a vocal teacher and his father owned a recording studio (Little Mountain Sound Studios). Ramsay inherited that love of music by initially starting his own solo career at the age of 14. He decided later that he needed a supporting band. Ramsay got together with his sister, Sara Ramsay, and formed the band Ramsay Fiction. After ultimately not working out, Ramsay joined high school friend Matt Webb in hopes of creating a new band. They found Ian Casselman in an ad in the newspaper, who introduced them to Mike Ayley, Ian's roommate at the time. The four members went through many names before finally settling on Marianas Trench.

Career

Marianas Trench
Ramsay formed the band Marianas Trench in 2001 and released their first self-titled EP, which contained songs that would appear on their limited edition video single, the Say Anything EP, their second EP Marianas Trench, and debut album Fix Me. The band later signed with 604 Records, through the assistance of owner Chad Kroeger and co-owner Jonathan Simkin. 

Ever After, the third studio album from Marianas Trench, went gold in its first week. The first single on the album, entitled "Haven't Had Enough" was released in July 2011, and reached the No. 1 spot on iTunes Canada Top of the Charts and Pop Downloads.

On April 22, 2013, at the annual Juno Awards, Marianas Trench won the 2013 Juno Award for Group of the Year.

On October 23, 2015, their fourth album, Astoria, was released. This album includes the singles "One Love", "This Means War", "Who Do You Love", "Shut Up and Kiss Me", and "Astoria". In 2017, they released "Rhythm of Your Heart". The story-theme album was recorded in Josh's home.

On March 1, 2019, their fifth album, Phantoms, was released, including singles such as "I Knew You When", "Only the Lonely Survive", and "Echoes of You". The band uses the idea of closely linked emotions attached to love and death throughout the album.

Songwriting and solo music

Ramsay plays 13 instruments, and often plays all of the instruments on the songs he produces for other artists. Ramsay was featured on the Carly Rae Jepsen song "Sour Candy" in 2008. He also worked on her song "Call Me Maybe" which was nominated for Song of the Year at the 2013 Grammy Awards, and "Hit Me Up" by Danny Fernandes. He also provided vocals for the opening theme song for The Hub's Transformers: Rescue Bots.

On April 8, 2022, he released a solo album titled The Josh Ramsay Show. It included features from other Canadian artists such as his sister Sara Ramsay, Ria Mae, Serena Ryder, and Fefe Dobson.

Personal life
On March 20, 2020, Ramsay posted a photo of himself and the Canadian actress-writer, Amanda McEwan to his Instagram feed announcing their marriage.

Discography
The discography of Marianas Trench, a Canadian pop rock band, consists of four studio albums, two extended plays, 18 singles and 18 music videos. The band have been certified multi-platinum by Music Canada for their CD and digital download sales.

Albums

Singles

As lead artist

As featured artist

Other appearances

Filmography

References

External links
 

1985 births
Living people
21st-century Canadian male singers
APRA Award winners
Canadian male guitarists
Canadian male singers
Canadian pop singers
Canadian songwriters
Musicians from Vancouver